Todo es mentira (Everything's a Lie) is a 1994 Spanish comedy film written and directed by Álvaro Fernández Armero and starring Penélope Cruz, Coque Malla and Jordi Mollà. It is the first in a series of two films, with El Juego de la Verdad (Truth or Dare) being the last film. Both  movies explore the complexities of relationships which include compromise and the unvarnished truth.

References

1994 films
1990s Spanish-language films
1994 comedy films
Spanish comedy films
1990s Spanish films